Huangtong is a town in Lingao County, in Hainan province, China. , it has 3 residential communities and 16 villages under its administration.

References

Township-level divisions of Hainan
Lingao County